Xanthophyllum ferrugineum is a tree in the family Polygalaceae. The specific epithet  is from the Latin meaning "rust-coloured", referring to the inflorescences.

Description
The smooth bark is grey or greenish. The flowers are yellow or white.

Distribution and habitat
Xanthophyllum ferrugineum is endemic to Borneo. Its habitat is mixed dipterocarp forests from sea-level to  altitude.

References

ferrugineum
Endemic flora of Borneo
Trees of Borneo
Plants described in 1973